The Broad Street Historic District encompasses a well-preserved 19th-century residential area in Middletown, Connecticut, USA.  Centered on Broad and Pearl Streets west of Main Street, the area was developed residential in response to local economic development intended to revitalize the city, whose port was in decline.  The district includes the city's largest concentration of Greek Revival houses, and was listed on the National Register of Historic Places in 1988.

Description and history
Middletown developed in the 18th century as a major port on the Connecticut River, but was in decline by the 1830s.  Community leaders revitalized the local economy by founding Wesleyan University in 1831, and investing in textile and machine industries.  The Wesleyan campus was laid out west of High Street, and the area between it and Main Street, originally open land used mainly for gardening, was developed residentially.  Although there had been some houses built during the Federal period, the amount of housing stock in this area tripled between 1830 and 1850.  The area was substantially built out by 1900, with only relatively minor additions and alterations since then.

The historic district is bounded on the north and south by Broad and Church Streets, and the west by High Street, and generally does not include buildings on those streets.  Its Broad Street is its eastern boundary; it includes all of the houses on its west side, and only a few on the east side between Court and Washington Streets.  College and Court Streets are the main cross streets in the district, and also including contributing properties.

Broad Street Historic District inventory 
According to the NRHP nomination, the district includes the following contributing properties:
9–11 Broad Street- 1820, Federal Style
15 Broad Street- 1880, Italianate
17 Broad Street- 1880, Italianate
23 Broad Street- c.1850, Queen Anne
25–27 Broad Street- c.1880, Queen Anne
51 Broad Street- c. 1850, Mid-19th century domestic, Henry Mansfield House
Garage associated with 51 Broad Street
55 Broad Street- c.1910, Colonial Revival
Garage associated with 55 Broad Street
59 Broad Street- c.1880, Queen Anne cross-gable
Garage associated with 59 Broad Street
85 Broad Street- Queen Anne Style
89–91 Broad Street- 1840, Greek Revival, Crandall-Cornwell House
93–97 Broad Street- c.1840, Greek Revival, William Hubbard Atkins House
101 Broad Street- c.1840, Greek Revival, Enoch C. Ferre House
Garage associated with 101 Broad Street
109 Broad Street- c.1845, Greek Revival, Samuel Stearns House
123 Broad Street- 1833 as Greek Revival church; Gothic Revival alteration 1875; modern additions 1970, 1986, Russell Library
138 Broad Street- 1883-1884, Stick Style, Joseph Elliott House
139 Broad Street- c.1860, Italianate, William Cooley, Jr. House
Garage associated with 139 Broad Street
144 Broad Street- 1902-1903, Colonial Revival, Church of the Holy Trinity and Rectory. The rectory is also known as the Bishop Acheson House, and is now a retirement home operated by St. Luke's.
145 Broad Street- c.1880, Italianate
Garage associated with 145 Broad Street
148 Broad Street- 1861, Victorian Italianate, Charles C. Hubbard House
151 Broad Street- c.1845, Greek Revival, Joseph Tobey House
148 College Street- 1822, Federal Style, First Randolph Pease House
151 College Street- 1832-1837, Greek Revival, Second Randolph Pease House
156–158 College Street- c.1880, 19th-century cross gable vernacular
157 College Street- 1840, Greek Revival
160 College Street- c.1775, Colonial, Hezekiah Hulbert Houser
Garage associated with 160 College Street
161 College Street- 1840/1870, Greek Revival/Italianate
Garage associated with 161 College Street
162–164 College Street- 19th-century vernacular
Garage associated with 162-164 College Street
165 College Street- 1839 Greek Revival, c. 1880 Italianate alterations, Nathaniel Smith House
166–168 College Street- c. 1840 Greek Revival
169–171 College Street- 1839, Greek Revival, Davis Arnold House
Garage associated with 169-171 College Street
170 College Street- c.1840, Greek Revival, Ezra Clark House
Garage associated with 170 College Street
175 College Street- c.1825, Federal/Greek Revival, 
Garage associated with 175 College Street
180 College Street- c.1865, Italianate, Samuel T. Camp House
186 College Street- c.1870, Italianate
Garage associated with 186 College Street
192 College Street- c.1880, Queen Anne
Garage associated with 192 College Street
196 College Street- c.1870, Italianate, Theophilus Chandler House
Garage associated with 196 College Street
200 College Street- c.1890, Queen Anne/Colonial Revival
201 College Street- c.1925, 20th-century institutional, Art Deco trim; condominiums 1982; Central School
208 College Street- 1765, moved to site c. 1830 from High Street, Colonial Gambrel, Joseph Hall House
212 College Street- 1886, 19th-century cross-gable
Garage associated with 212 College Street
221–223 College Street- c. 1850/1870, Greek Revival/Italianate
Garage associated with 221-223 College Street
229 Court Street- c. 1880, Queen Anne
234 Court Street- c. 1825-28, remodeled c. 1910, Colonial Revival, John & Susan Smith House
235 Court Street- c.1860, Greek Revival/Italianate
238 Court Street- c.1850, Greek Revival
Garage associated with 238 Court Street
240–242 Court Street- c.1830, Georgian/Federal, Sage Russell House
Garage associated with 240-242 Court Street
241 Court Street- c.1870, Mansard
250 Court Street- 1883-1884, Queen Anne/stick, J. Peters Pelton House
Garage associated with 250 Court Street
251 Court Street- 1894-1896, Romanesque Revival converted to elderly housing 1980,  Old Middletown High School (listed in its own right on the NRHP, reference number 85001826)
258 Court Street- 1880, Queen Anne, Eastlake detail, 1880
Garage associated with 258 Court Street
264 Court Street- 1873, Mansard, Haskell-Vinal House
Garage associated with 264 Court Street
267 Court Street- c.1870, Italianate
268 Court Street- c.1920, Jacobean Revival
Garage associated with 268 Court Street
271 Court Street- c.1840, Greek Revival, Samuel Breese House
Garage associated with 271 Court Street
279 Court Street- 1814, Federal, Oliver D. Beebe House
285 Court Street- 1911, Georgian Revival, Parsonage, First Congregational Church (since at least the 1970s, Wesleyan University English Department )
(no number) Pearl Place- c.1860, 19th-century cross-gable
11 Pearl Street- 1874, Italianate, Camp/Wilcox House
12 Pearl Street- c.1850, Greek Revival cottage
15 Pearl Street- 1838, Greek Revival cottage, George E. Barrows House
Garage associated with 15 Pearl Street
16 Pearl Street- 1839, Greek Revival cottage, Zebulon H. Baldwin House
Garage associated with 16 Pearl Street
20 Pearl Street- c. 1840/1870, Greek Revival/Mansard, 
24 Pearl Street- c. 1870, Mansard 
28 Pearl Street- c. 1840, Greek Revival, Charles Brewer House
Garage associated with 28 Pearl Street
59 Pearl Street- 1884, Queen Anne
60 Pearl Street- c. 1840, Greek Revival
Garage associated with 60 Pearl Street
63 Pearl Street- c. 1900, Queen Anne/Colonial Revival
Garage associated with 63 Pearl Street
64 Pearl Street- c. 1880, Queen Anne
66 Pearl Street- 1889, 19th-century domestic
Barn/garage associated with 66 Pearl Street
70 Pearl Street- c. 1840, Greek Revival
73 Pearl Street- 1813, Federal, Starr/Russell House
74 Pearl Street- 1890, Queen Anne
Garage associated with 74 Pearl Street
77 Pearl Street- 1900/1930 Queen Anne/Colonial Revival, Russell Carriage House
78 Pearl Street- 1886, James C. Hubbard House
80 Pearl Street- 1889, Queen Anne
Garage associated with 80 Pearl Street
86 Pearl Street- 1889, Queen Anne
Garage associated with 86 Pearl Street
90 Pearl Street- 1889, Queen Anne
Garage associated with 90 Pearl Street

Pictures

See also
National Register of Historic Places listings in Middletown, Connecticut

References

External links
  and 

Middletown, Connecticut
Historic districts in Middlesex County, Connecticut
National Register of Historic Places in Middlesex County, Connecticut
Historic districts on the National Register of Historic Places in Connecticut
1988 establishments in Connecticut